Salento can mean:

 Salento, an area of south-eastern Apulia, Italy
 Salento, Campania, a municipality of the Province of Salerno, Campania, Italy
 Salento, Quindío, a municipality in the department of Quindío, Colombia
 Salentino, a dialect spoken in the Apulian area of Salento